Alvania electa is a species of minute sea snail, a marine gastropod mollusk or micromollusk in the family Rissoidae.

Description

Distribution

References

 Gofas, S.; Le Renard, J.; Bouchet, P. (2001). Mollusca. in: Costello, M.J. et al. (eds), European Register of Marine Species: a check-list of the marine species in Europe and a bibliography of guides to their identification. Patrimoines Naturels. 50: 180-213
 Sysoev A.V. (2014). Deep-sea fauna of European seas: An annotated species check-list of benthic invertebrates living deeper than 2000 m in the seas bordering Europe. Gastropoda. Invertebrate Zoology. Vol.11. No.1: 134–155 
New records of Rissoidae (Mollusca: Gastropoda) for the Hellenic Seas with the description of Rissoa electrae n. sp.. Xenophora Taxonomy 26: 11-19

External links
 Monterosato T. A. (di) (1874 (luglio)). Recherches conchyliologiques, effectuées au Cap Santo Vito, en Sicile. (Traduz. dall'italiano di H. Crosse). Journal de Conchyliologie 22 (3) : 243-282 (luglio) 22 (4)
 Jeffreys J.G. 1884. On the Mollusca procured during the 'Lightning' and 'Porcupine' expeditions 1868-70 (Part VII). Proceedings of the Zoological Society of London, 1884: 111-149, pl. 9-10

Rissoidae
Gastropods described in 1874